Mikhail Dmitriyevich Gaydamak (born 21 November 1996) is a Russian football player who plays for Torpedo Miass.

Club career
He made his debut in the Russian Professional Football League for FC Sibir-2 Novosibirsk on 7 August 2018 in a game against FC Sakhalin Yuzhno-Sakhalinsk.

References

External links
 Profile by Russian Professional Football League
 
 

1996 births
Living people
Russian footballers
Sportspeople from Novosibirsk
Association football midfielders
FC Tom Tomsk players
FC Sibir Novosibirsk players
FC Volna Pinsk players
FC Okean Kerch players
FC Chita players
FC Torpedo Miass players
Russian First League players
Belarusian First League players
Crimean Premier League players
Russian expatriate footballers
Expatriate footballers in Belarus
Russian expatriate sportspeople in Belarus